Shrimali Brahmins are believed to have originated from Srimal (the present-day Bhinmal) in Jalore district in the Indian state of Rajasthan.

References

Brahmin communities of Rajasthan